DYEY (93.5 FM), broadcasting as 93.5 Easy Rock, is a radio station owned by Manila Broadcasting Company through its licensee Cebu Broadcasting Company and operated by JME Broadcast Resources. Its studio and transmitter are located at Brgy. Balabag, Malay, Aklan.

References

Radio stations in Boracay
Adult contemporary radio stations in the Philippines
Radio stations established in 2009
Easy Rock Network stations

ceb:DYYS